These Re-Imagined Machines is a remix album by American electronic musician BT, composed of remixed  versions of songs from his album These Hopeful Machines by various artists. The album was released on May 20, 2011.

Track listing

References

External links
 

2011 remix albums
BT (musician) compilation albums